The 2019 William Jones Cup is the 41st staging of William Jones Cup, an international basketball tournament held in Changhua, and New Taipei City, Taiwan. The men's tournament was held from 12 to 21 July 2019 while the women's tournament will be contested from 24 to 28 July 2019.

Men's tournament

Participating teams

Team standings

|}

Games

Day 1

Day 2

Day 3

Day 4

Day 5

Day 6

Day 7

Day 8

Day 9

+

Women's tournament

Participating teams 
 Mitsubishi Electric Koalas
 Korea National Bank KB Stars

|}

Games

Day 1

Day 2

Day 3

Day 4

Day 5

References

2019
2019 in Taiwanese sport
2019–20 in Asian basketball
William Jones Cup